A teenage tragedy song is a style of ballad in popular music that peaked in popularity in the late 1950s and early 1960s. Examples of the style are also known as "tear jerkers", "death discs" or "splatter platters", among other colorful sobriquets coined by DJs that then passed into vernacular as the songs became popular. Often lamenting teenage death scenarios in melodramatic fashion, these songs were usually sung from the viewpoint of the dead person's sweetheart, as in "Last Kiss" (1961), or another witness to the tragedy, or the dead (or dying) person. Other examples include "Teen Angel" by Mark Dinning (1959), "Tell Laura I Love Her" by Ray Peterson (1960), "Ebony Eyes" by the Everly Brothers (1961), "Dead Man's Curve" by Jan and Dean (1964), and "Leader of the Pack" by the Shangri-Las (1964). The genre's popularity faded around 1965 (as a mostly American phenomenon, it was one of many musical formats that were drowned out by the British Invasion), but inspired a host of similar songs and parodies over the years.

Origins and format
By the mid-1950s, postwar youth culture in the U.S. was embracing rock and roll, and the folk revival was also approaching its zenith – the narrative style of many teenage tragedy songs had similarities to folk balladry. Prison ballads (such as the Kingston Trio's "Tom Dooley", based on a folk song about a real murder) and gunfighter ballads (such as Johnny Cash's "Don't Take Your Guns to Town" and Marty Robbins' "El Paso", the latter followed at #1 by two consecutive teenage tragedy songs, "Running Bear" and "Teen Angel"), with similar themes of death, were also popular during the heyday of teen tragedy songs.

The teen tragedy genre's popular era began with "Black Denim Trousers and Motorcycle Boots", written by Jerry Leiber and Mike Stoller. Released just before 24-year-old actor James Dean's death in an automobile accident in the fall of 1955, it climbed the charts immediately afterward.  Teenage tragedies had specific thematic tropes such as star-crossed lovers, reckless youth, eternal devotion, suicide, and despair over lost love; along with lyrical elements that teens of the time could relate to their own lives – such as dating, motorcycles and automobiles (car songs also being popular during the 1950s), and disapproving parents or peers. Contemporary girl groups of the '60s also borrowed the genre's melodramatic template (as well as the use of sound effects, orchestration, echo and other sonic touches) for non-fatal but otherwise tragic story-songs, such as Reparata and the Delrons' over-the-top "Saturday Night Didn't Happen" and its B-side, "Panic", in 1968. In the Pussycats' 1966 "Dressed in Black", (co-written by George 'Shadow' Morton, and originally a Shangri-Las B-side) and in "We Don't Belong" by UK singer Sylvan (1965), the heartbreak and melancholy are palpable – and in Sylvan's case, nearly suicidal.

Ethnomusicologist Kirsten Zemke considers these songs as forming a strictly musical genre that was bound by common thematic tropes, musical style and production elements; and as being of their time. As for their popularity, she writes:They sold well in their time, and the style has persisted throughout the decades in various forms. And ….they have an interesting history. The question some writers have asked is "why?". Some of the reasons suggested for this genre’s macabre popularity are:
These were the ultimate teen rebellion songs. The only way out of parents' (and/or societal) control and expectations was death.
They were a natural extension of the "unrequited love" song, facilitated by the obvious rhyming of: good bye, cry and die.
There were a number of publicized deaths of pop stars and young actors during that period, including Sam Cooke, Johnny Ace, Eddie Cochran; and of course the plane crash that killed Buddy Holly, Ritchie Valens, and the Big Bopper in 1959. This might explain the interest in songs around death, tragedy and sorrow.

Examples

Deathless themes
Teenagers meeting with tragedy in song was not new in the 1950s (or for that matter in the 1650s, around the time "Barbara Allen" was popular). In literature, it has been a recurring and resonant  theme over centuries, most notably in William Shakespeare's "Romeo and Juliet". Another early example in song is "Oh My Darling, Clementine", published in 1884 but based on earlier songs and apparently written as a parody.

As popular music and the society it mirrored changed from the late 1960s onward, the themes carried on in different forms and styles. Songs and spoken-word productions about the dangers of drug abuse joined the parade of pathos on radio airwaves, ranging from three-minute morality plays to lamentations (from the parental perspective) on the generation gap. These include "Once You Understand" by Think (U.S. #23, 1971) and radio and TV host Art Linkletter's Grammy-winning single "We Love You, Call Collect" (U.S. #42, 1969). Recorded before his daughter Diane's apparent suicide in 1969, the record also included Diane speaking the reply, "Dear Mom and Dad". Into the 1970s, as the Vietnam War continued, hit ballads of youth and death included Terry Jacks' No. 1 hit "Seasons in the Sun" (1974), their protagonists of indeterminate age, or slightly older than teens. A song that was thought to have referenced the Civil War was Paper Lace's 1974 hit "Billy Don't Be a Hero", made a bigger hit in the U.S. by Bo Donaldson and the Heywoods. Hard-rock acts recorded vehicular death scenarios such as "D.O.A." (Bloodrock, 1971), "Detroit Rock City" (Kiss, 1976) and "Bat Out of Hell" (Meat Loaf, 1977).

Teenage tragedy would continue to chart through the 1970s. In 1979, "I Don't Like Mondays" was written by Bob Geldof and Johnnie Fingers, inspired by the Grover Cleveland school shooting in San Diego that occurred while the Boomtown Rats were on tour in the U.S. The song went to No. 1 in the U.K., and No. 4 in Canada. The Smiths' 1987 song "Girlfriend in a Coma" also took inspiration from teenage tragedy songs, by taking the melodramatic aspect and pushing it to extremes. Some songs merely updated the sound of the previous era, such as "Racing Car" by Dutch group Air Bubble (1976), while others used the melodic and stylistic tropes of teen tragedy in tougher, grittier settings, as in the Ramones' "You're Gonna Kill That Girl" (1977) and "7-11" (1981), and the Misfits' "Saturday Night" (1999). "Teen Idle" by Marina and the Diamonds (2012), evoking an archetype of disenfranchised youth, is a thematic heir to the original teen tragedy oeuvre.

Satires and parodies

Notable parody songs, satires and send-ups of teen tragedy over the decades have included:
 "Let's Think About Living" (1960), with Bob Luman mocking then-current musical trends, and trying to steer listeners away from the fascination with teenage death songs and gunfighter ballads.
 "Valerie", a 1961 doo-wop styled teen tragedy spoof by the Mark III, a young folk trio.
 "All I Have Left is Johnny's Hubcap" on the 1962 parody album, Mad “Twists” Rock ’n’ Roll, produced in association with Mad magazine.
 "Surfin' Tragedy" (1963) by the Breakers, in which a surfer careens "90 miles an hour" into a Malibu pier, killing him instantly. It is included on The Rhino Brothers Present the World's Worst Records.
"Leader of the Laundromat" by the Detergents (1964), a direct parody of the Shangri-Las' hit, written by Paul Vance and Lee Pockriss. The Detergents were a studio group that included singer Ron Dante, later of the Archies.
 Jimmy Cross's "I Want My Baby Back" (1965), a novelty record about a fatal head-on collision with "The Leader of the Pack", narrated in a down-home patter reminiscent of Andy Griffith. The single made the Billboard Hot 100 (reaching #92), and became a cult classic years later from airplay on Dr. Demento's syndicated radio show; it is on the World's Worst Records compilation and on Rhino's 1984 compilation LP Teenage Tragedies.
In a 1965 episode of The Lucy Show, "Lucy in the Music World", Lucille Ball tried to appeal to teenagers with a song about a boyfriend whose "surfboard came back by itself." She had been advised that youth today "aren't happy unless they're miserable."
 "Death Cab for Cutie" by the Bonzo Dog Doo-Dah Band (1967), the inspiration for the band of the same name.
 Randy Newman's song "Lucinda", on his 1970 album 12 Songs, concerns a girl who falls asleep on the beach in her graduation gown, and is killed and buried by a beach cleaning machine.
 In John Entwistle's "Roller Skate Kate", from his 1973 album Rigor Mortis Sets In, the heroine is killed while skating in the high-speed lane of the motorway.
10cc's 1973 song "Johnny Don't Do It", done in the style of early 1960s girl-group songs, with the trope of the bad boy who is good but misunderstood. Johnny steals a motorcycle and hits a truck, killing his girlfriend along with himself.
Gilda Radner, Jane Curtin, and Laraine Newman recorded a song for season 2 of Saturday Night Live entitled "Chevy, Chevy" which is a send-up of teen tragedy, presenting Chevy Chase as a teen idol.
 On The Rich Little Show of March 8, 1976, Tom Bosley and "Sweathogs" Lawrence Hilton-Jacobs, Robert Hegyes, and Ron Palillo sang a parody of the genre called "Pizza Death", in which the simple-minded driver of a pizzeria delivery van crashed, affording the by-standers an opportunity for free pizza.
 "My Baby's the Star of a Driver's Ed Movie," a 1983 song by Blotto.
 "The Homecoming Queen's Got a Gun" by comedian and singer Julie Brown. Released nationally in 1984, the song (along with an accompanying video in heavy MTV rotation) was both a parody of the genre, and a satire of valley girl culture.
 Tom Chapin and Michael Mark wrote a parody of a teenage tragedy song called "The Battle Beast and Barbie" for Chapin's 1994 album "So Nice To Come Home." Written in the parodic style of a '60s girl group tragedy ballad, it involves two plastic toys who "met by accident and fell in love", only for Battle Beast to be shot down by "Ken" at the school prom.
 The MST3K treatment of the 1996 film Werewolf included a sketch in which Mike and the bots dressed up as a girl group to sing "Where, O Werewolf", about "Suzy" (Mike) in a doomed relationship with her werewolf boyfriend.
"Road Man" by Smash Mouth, in which a roadie is hit by a train while rushing to get the band's gear to a show.
 Rilo Kiley, with lead singer Jenny Lewis, recorded "Teenage Love Song", a genre parody in which the singer laments being abandoned by her boyfriend after having sex in a motel room.
 In "The Living End" by the Jesus and Mary Chain, a leather-clad biker in love with himself ends up crashing into a tree.

See also
 Tragedy
 Murder ballad
 Obituary poetry
 Star-crossed lovers
 List of car crash songs

References

External links
 Oldies.about.com